The  Ministry of Finance is a Jordan government ministry responsible for public finances of the  Hashemite Kingdom of Jordan in co-operation with the Central Bank of Jordan.

Ministers of Finance 
Hasan Al-Hakim, 1921 
Madhar Raslan, 1921-1922
Ahmed Hilmi Pasha, 1922-1924
Hasan Abu Al-Huda, 1924-1926
Alan Kirkbride, 1926-1928 (British)
Ibrahim Hashem, 1928-1931
Abd Allah Siraj, 1931-1933
Shukri Shashaa, 1933-1938
Abdullah Al-Hamoud, 1938-1939
Abdullah Al-Hamoud, 1939-1940
Nokola Ghanima, 1940-1941
Nokola Ghanima, 1941-1942
Shukri Shashaa, 1943
Samir Al-Rifai, 1943-1944
Moussallam Al-Attar, 1944-1945
Sa'id Mufti, 1945
Mohammad al-Shoreki, 1945-1946
Nokola Ghanima, 1946-1947
Suleiman Nabulsi, 1947
Mohammad al-Shoreki, 1947
Suleiman Al-Sukar, 1947-1949
Suleiman Al-Sukar, 1949-1950
Suleiman Nabulsi, 1950-1951
Abdulrahman Khalifa, 1951
Abdul Halim Al-Nimr, 1951-1952
Musa Nasser, 1952-1953
Suleiman Al-Sukar, 1953-1954
Abdulrahman Khalifa, 1954
Anastas Hanania, 1954-1955
Bishara Ghosein, 1955
Khulusi Al-Khairi, 1955-1956
Hashem Al-Jayousi, 1956
Bishara Ghosein, 1956
Salah Toukan, 1956-1957
Suleiman Al-Sukar, 1957
Anastas Hanania, 1957-1958
Ahmad Al-Tarawneh, 1958-1959
Samaan Dawoud, 1959
Hashem Al-Jayousi, 1959-1962
Mohammad Ismail, 1962
Izz al-Din Al-Mufti, 1962
Hashem Al-Jayousi, 1962-1963
Nizam al-Sharabi, 1963
Abdullatif Anabtawi, 1963
Nizam al-Sharabi, 1963-1964
Hashem Al-Jayousi, 1964-1965
Izz al-Din Al-Mufti, 1965-1966
Said Al-Dajani, 1966-1967
Abdulwahhab Al-Majali, 1967
Hashem Al-Jayousi, 1967-1969
Fadel Al-Dalqamuni, 1969
Yaqub Muammar, 1969-1970
Wasfi Anabtawi, 1970
Abdul-Qadir Tash, 1970
Fahd Jaradat, 1970
Fawwaz Al-Rousan, 1970
Ahmad Lozi, 1970 
Anis Mouasher, 1971-1972
Fareed Al-Saad, 1972-1973
Mohammad Shafik, 1973
Dhuqan Al-Hindawi, 1973-1974
Salem Massadeh, 1974-1976
Mohammad Dabbas, 1976-1979
Salem Massadeh, 1979-1984
Hanna Odeh, 1984-1989
Basil Jardaneh, 1989-1993
Sami Qammuh, 1993-1995
Basil Jardaneh, 1995-1996
Marwan Awad, 1996-1997
Suleiman Hafez, 1997-1998
Michel Marto, 1998-2003
Mohammad Abu Hammour, 2003-2005
Bassem Awadallah, 2005
Adel Al-Qudah, 2005-2006
Ziad Fariz, 2006-2007
Hamad Al-Kasasbeh, 2007-2009
Bassem Al-Salem, 2009
Mohammad Abu Hammour, 2009-2011
Umayya Toukan, 2011-2012
Suleiman Hafez, 2012-2013
Umayya Toukan, 2013-2015
Omar Malhas, 2015-2018
Ezzedin Kanakrieh, 2018-2019
Mohamad Al Ississ, 2019-
Sources:

See also
 Central Bank of Jordan
 Government of Jordan
 Economy of Jordan
 Finance ministry
 Jordanian dinar

References

External links
 Ministry of Finance official website

 
Finance
Jordan
Ministries established in 1920
1920s establishments in Transjordan